Hòa Phú is a ward of Thủ Dầu Một in Bình Dương Province, Vietnam.

References

Communes of Bình Dương province
Populated places in Bình Dương province